"Topaze" was an American television play broadcast on September 26, 1957, as part of the second season of the CBS television series Playhouse 90. Ellis St. Joseph wrote the teleplay based on Marcel Pagnol's 1928 play, Topaze. Vincent J. Donehue directed, Martin Manulis was the producer, and Robert Drasnin composed the music. Sterling Hayden was the host, and Ernie Kovacs and Carl Reiner starred.

The program's commercial sponsors were the American Gas Association, Theradan anti-dandruff shampoo, Marlboro cigarettes, and Ipana toothpaste.

Plot
Topaze, an idealistic teacher in a small French school, is fired for refusing to adjust the grades of the son of an influential and corrupt politician. The politician then hires Topaze as the head of a dummy corporation, serving as bagman and money launderer. After realizing that he has been taken advantage of, Topaze embraces the corruption to achieve his own fortune.

Cast
The following performers received screen credit for their performances:

 Ernie Kovacs - Topaze
 Carl Reiner - Regis
 Richard Haydn - Muche
 Sheree North - Suzy
 Stephen Wooton - Young Castel-Benac
 Roxanne Arlen - Germaine
 Moira Turner - Ernestine
 William Roerick - the Count

References

1957 television plays
1957 American television episodes
Playhouse 90 (season 2) episodes
Adaptations of works by Marcel Pagnol